Jules David Prown (born March 14, 1930, in Freehold) is an American art historian. Prown is the Paul Mellon Professor Emeritus of the History of Art at Yale University, where he has focused on American art and the art of John Singleton Copley since 1961.

Career
Born to Max Prown and Matilda Cassileth in Freehold, Prown attended the Peddie School. He received his Bachelor of Arts from Lafayette College (1951). He then continued on to receive two Master of Arts degrees from Harvard University (1953) and the University of Delaware in Early American Culture (1956), respectively. Prown completed his Doctor of Philosophy in Art History from Harvard (1961). There, his dissertation was titled "The English Career of John Singleton Copley, R.A," in which he studied the painter John Singleton Copley.

Upon graduating from Harvard, Prown began teaching at Yale University, where he has remained throughout his career. He is now the Paul Mellon Professor Emeritus of the History of Art. He has also held the posts of Curator of American Art at the Yale University Art Gallery and is the Founding Director of the Yale Center for British Art.

In 1964, Prown was awarded a Guggenheim Fellowship in Fine Arts.

See also
List of Guggenheim Fellowships awarded in 1964
List of Lafayette College people
List of Harvard University people
List of University of Delaware people

References

External links
Yale University profile
Dictionary of Art Historians profile

1930 births
Living people
Peddie School alumni
People from Freehold Township, New Jersey
American art historians
Lafayette College alumni
University of Delaware alumni
Harvard University alumni
Yale University faculty